The 2022 Duke Blue Devils women's soccer team represented Duke University during the 2022 NCAA Division I women's soccer season.  The Blue Devils were led by head coach Robbie Church, in his twenty-second season.  They played home games at Koskinen Stadium.  This was the team's 35th season playing organized women's college soccer and their 34th playing in the Atlantic Coast Conference.

The team finished 15–5–3 overall and 6–2–2 in ACC play to finish in a tie for fourth place.  As the fifth-seed in the ACC Tournament, they defeated fourth-seed Virginia in the First Round, but lost to North Carolina in the Semifinal.  They received an at-large bid to the NCAA Tournament, where they were the second seed in the Alabama Bracket.  They defeated  in the First Round, seventh-seed  in the Second Round, and third-seed  in the Round of 16 before falling in overtime to first-seed  in the Quarterfinals.

Previous season 

The Blue Devils finished the season with a 16–4–1 record, 7–2–1 in ACC play to finish in third place.  The lost in the First Round of the ACC Tournament.  They received an at-large bid to the NCAA Tournament where they were awarded one of the top four seeds.  They defeated Old Dominion in the First Round, Memphis in the Second Round, and St. John's in the Round of 16 before losing to Santa Clara in the Semifinals to end their season.

Offseason

Departures

Incoming Transfers

Recruiting Class

Source:

Squad

Roster

Team management

Source:

Schedule 
Source:

|-
!colspan=6 style=""| Exhibition

|-
!colspan=6 style=""| Non-Conference Regular season

|-
!colspan=6 style=""| ACC Regular season

|-
!colspan=6 style=""| ACC Tournament

|-
!colspan=6 style=""| NCAA Tournament

Awards and honors

Rankings

2023 NWSL draft

Source:

References

Duke Blue Devils women's soccer seasons
Duke women's soccer
Duke
Duke
Duke